Rakshabandhan... Rasal Apne Bhai Ki Dhal is an Indian television series which airs on Dangal TV. It stars Nishant Malkani, Nyra Banerjee, Azinkya Mishra and Hardika Sharma. The show premiered on 19 July 2021.

Plot 
This story is of brother and sister named Rasal and Shivraj.  In this, his father brings him up well. Many people in the society make fun of her not being a mother. Once his father Umed Pratap Singh meets with an accident and is caught by the robber bride named Chakori.  And she thinks that if she gets a place in her house, only the rich will be rich. After the accident of Umed Pratap Singh, he thinks that if something happens to him, who will take care of his children. That's why he thinks of getting married again and bringing the children as step mother. But Rasal was afraid that his step-mother would not take good care of him. Chakori (the robber bride) tries a lot to kill those children but is not successful.

Cast

Main
 Nishant Singh Malkani in a triple role as:
Umed Pratap Singh Thakur: Chand widower; Rasal and Shivraj and Balwant's father; Phooli's husband; Jivika's grandfather; Sarmat's maternal grandfather (Dead) (2021)
Shivraj Umed Pratap Singh Thakur (Singhsaal): Phooli and Umed 's son; Balwant and Rasal's brother; Kanak's first husband;  Menka's second Husband; Jivika' s father; Sarmat's maternal uncle (2021–2022) 
Azinkya Mishra as Young Shivraj Singhsaal Singh (2021)
Balwant Singh Thakur: Umed and Chanda's son; Bilji's half-brother; Shivraj and Rasal's brother Jivika's material uncle (2022-2022)
 Nyra Banerjee as Chakori Moong Singh: Third wife and murderer of Umed Pratap Singh; Moong Singh's wife; Shivraj and Rasal's second stepmother (Main Antagonist)
 Varsha Sharma as Rasal Arjun Pratap Singh: Phooli and Umed's daughter; Shivraj and Balwant's sister; Samar's widow ; Arjun's wife, Kanak's nanad; Sarmat' s mother; Jivika's Maami (2021–2022)
 Hardika Sharma as Young Rasal Umed Singh (2021)

Recurring
 Vaishali Takkar as Kanak Shivraj Pratap Singh Thakur (Singhsaal): Ratan and Purnima's daughter; Jay and Kangana's sister; Shivraj's first wife; Balwant and Rasal's sister-in-law; Jivika' s mother; Sarmat's maami (2021–2022)
Farman Haider as Samar Kamal Pratap Choudhary: Kamal's son; Rasal's first husband; Sarmat's father (Dead) (2021–2022) 
 Sanchita Banerjee as Phooli Umed Pratap Singh Thakur: Bheem's sister; Shivraj and Rasal's mother; and Umed Pratap Singh's first wife; and Jivika and Sarmat's grandmother (Dead) (2021)
 Yogendra Kumeria as Bheem Singh: Phooli's brother; Kamlesh's husband Ajju s'father (2021)
 Manisha Purohit as Kamlesh Bheem Singh: Ajju's mother and Bheem's wife; Phooli's sister-in-law (2021)
 Ajay Sharma as Ratan Pratap Singh: Jay, Kanak and Kangana's father, Purnima 's husband Jivika's maternal (2021–present)
 Anurag Vyas as Jay Ratan Singh: Ratan and Purnima's son, Kanak and kangana's brother; Jivika's maternal uncle (2021–present)
 Prachee Prathak as Purnima Ratan Singh: Kanak,Kangana and Jay's mother, Ratan's wife Jivika's maternal grandmother (2021–present)
 Soneer Vadhera as Moong Singh Thakur:Ammaji's son, Chakori's husband and accomplice (2021–present)
 Rupa Divetia as Ammaji Singh Thakur a.k.s Dadi Sa: Moong's mother and Shivraj and Rasal's granddadi (2021–present)
Asmita Sharma as Yashoda Devi: Arjun's mother and Karana's widow Sarmat's grandmother (2022-present)
Abhishek Sharma as Arjun Karan Pratap Singh:Karan and Yashoda's son, Rasaal's second Husband;Sarmat's father (2022-present)
Deblina Chatterjee as Kangana Ratan Singh: Ratan and Purnima's daughter Jay and kanak's sister and Shivraj's love (2022-present)
Shalini Mahhali as Menka Shivraj Singh: Samar's love and Shivraj's second Wife(2021-2022) (Dead)

References 

2021 Indian television series debuts
2022 Indian television series endings
Indian television series
Indian television soap operas
Serial drama television series
Hindi-language television shows
Indian drama television series
Television shows set in Rajasthan
Dangal TV original programming